We Love TV is a British game show that aired on ITV from 14 September 1984 to 16 August 1986 and is hosted by Gloria Hunniford.

Transmissions

External links

1980s British game shows
1984 British television series debuts
1986 British television series endings
London Weekend Television shows
English-language television shows
Television series by ITV Studios